NEBULA was a political party in the Indian state of Sikkim. NEBULA stands for Nepali Bhutia Lepcha, the three largest ethnic groups in the state. 

NEBULA was founded in 1999 when the former Deputy Chief Minister of Sikkim, P.T. Lucksom, was expelled from Sikkim Democratic Front. NEBULA joined the Sikkim United Democratic Alliance (SUDA) in 2004. Lucksom represented NEBULA in the ad-hoc committee of SUDA.

S.W.LADENLA first coined the word "NeBuLa". He was also concerned with communal harmony among Nepali, Bhutia and Lepcha. Under the advice of concerned citizen of then Darjeeling, he was able to form a Union called Hill Peoples’ Social Union in 1934. Later the Union was famous for the motto "NeBuLa".

In 2013, NEBULA merged with Trinamool Congress.

See also
 Bhutia-Lepcha

References

Defunct political parties in Sikkim
1999 establishments in Sikkim
Political parties established in 1999